Adélaïde is a 1968 French drama film directed by Jean-Daniel Simon and starring Ingrid Thulin, Jean Sorel and Sylvie Fennec.
 In English it is sometimes known as The Depraved.  It was based on a novella by Joseph-Arthur de Gobineau and produced by Pierre Kalfon.

Plot
A young woman, named Adélaïde lives in France, and she is pursued by many suitors, but she turns them all down because her one true love has gone away to war, and she has not heard of him for months, though she does not give up hope and lies in wait of his return. In the end he dies in the war, killed by a German soldier, but she knows in her heart he is still with her.

Cast
 Ingrid Thulin ...  Elisabeth Hermann 
 Jean Sorel ...  Frédéric Cornault 
 Sylvie Fennec ...  Adelaide 
 Jacques Portet ...  Jacques Potier 
 Faith Brook ...  Dickson 
 Jean-Pierre Bernard ...  Christian 
 Joëlle Bernard ...  Janine 
 Robert Higgins ...  Médecin 
 Eve Mylonas ...  Alexa 
 Christine Simon ...  Buxy 
 Simone Guisin ...  Hélène

References

External links

1968 films
1960s French-language films
1968 drama films
French drama films
1960s French films